Maksim Pavlovich Nizovtsev (born 9 September 1972 in Kostanay) is a Kazakhstani professional football coach and a former player. Nizovtsev has also played for the Kazakhstan national football team in 16 games scoring 2 goals from 1994 to 2005.

He previously played for FC Chernomorets Novorossiysk in the Russian Premier League.

Career statistics

Club statistics

Last update: 1 January 2009

International goals

Honours 
with Baltika
 Russian First Division Winner: 1995

with Tobol
 Kazakhstan League Runner-up: 2005

with Aktobe
 Kazakhstan League Runner-up: 2006

References

External links

Living people
People from Kostanay
1972 births
Kazakhstani footballers
Kazakhstani expatriate footballers
Kazakhstan international footballers
Association football midfielders
PFC CSKA Moscow players
FC Chernomorets Novorossiysk players
FC Baltika Kaliningrad players
FC Sokol Saratov players
FC Aktobe players
FC Tobol players
Expatriate footballers in Russia
Kazakhstan Premier League players
Russian Premier League players